A national oil company (NOC) is an oil and gas company fully or in the majority-owned by a national government. According to the World Bank, NOCs accounted for 75% global oil production and controlled 90% of proven oil reserves in 2010.

Due to their increasing dominance over global reserves, the importance of NOCs relative to International Oil Companies (IOCs), such as ExxonMobil, BP, or Royal Dutch Shell, has risen dramatically in recent decades. NOCs are also increasingly investing outside their national borders.

See also
 List of petroleum companies
 Nationalization of oil supplies

External links
 National Oil Companies and Value Creation (World Bank study, 2010)

References

 
Petroleum economics